"Always Yours" is a song by English glam rock singer Gary Glitter, written by Glitter with Mike Leander and produced by Mike Leander. It was released as a standalone single in the UK in 1974, and was Glitter's third and final number-one single on the UK Singles Chart, spending a week at the top of the chart in June 1974. It also spent two weeks at number-one in Ireland, and peaked at No. 11 in Australia and No. 14 in Germany. The single features the non-album track, "I'm Right, You're Wrong, I Win!" as its B-side, which was exclusive to the single.

Track listing
"Always Yours" – 3:23
"I'm Right, You're Wrong, I Win!" – 2:41

Chart performance

Certifications

References

External links
 

UK Singles Chart number-one singles
Irish Singles Chart number-one singles
1974 songs
Gary Glitter songs
Songs written by Mike Leander
Song recordings produced by Mike Leander
Songs written by Gary Glitter